The Longyear River is a river which runs through the Longyear Valley, passing through the town of Longyearbyen and draining into Adventfjorden on the island of Spitsbergen in Svalbard, Norway. It is named for the American industrialist John Munroe Longyear.

References

Longyearbyen
Rivers of Spitsbergen